Stygobromus nortoni, commonly called Norton's cave amphipod, is a troglomorphic species of amphipod in family Crangonyctidae. It is endemic to Tennessee in the United States.

References

Freshwater crustaceans of North America
Cave crustaceans
Crustaceans described in 1969
nortoni
Endemic fauna of Tennessee